Saint Bassus of Nice (d. 250/251) is a 3rd-century Roman Catholic saint and martyr, traditionally the earliest named bishop of Nice. 
 
He was active on the Côte d'Azur, and was martyred for his faith under the Emperor Decius by being burned with red-hot blades and pierced from head to feet by two large ship-building nails, one through each foot.

He is venerated as a saint. His feast day is 5 December. He is the patron saint of Cupra Marittima in Italy, where his body was taken after his death, and since 1922 or 1923 the second patron saint of Nice.

See also
Decian persecution

References

Gallo-Roman saints
3rd-century Christian martyrs
Year of birth unknown
250s deaths
3rd-century bishops in Gaul
Bishops of Nice
3rd-century Christian saints